Bazentin is a commune in the Somme department in Hauts-de-France in northern France.

Geography
Situated between Amiens to the southwest and Arras to the north, on the D73 road.

Population

History
 1914–1918: The village, in the middle of the war zone, was completely destroyed.

Places and monuments
 Memorial to the naturalist Jean-Baptiste Lamarck
 Bazentin-le-Petit Military Cemetery
 Bazentin-le-Petit Communal Cemetery Extension

People
 Birthplace of Jean-Baptiste Lamarck, 1 August 1744

Gallery

See also
Communes of the Somme department
Battle of Bazentin Ridge

References

External links

(All French language)
 Official municipal website
 Clochers.org Photos of the church (Taken in 2005 by Claude DEROLETZ)
 Bazentin-le-Petit Communal Cemetery
 South Africans buried in Bazenin Military Cemetery

Communes of Somme (department)